Paulines may refer to:

Order of Saint Paul the First Hermit, a Roman Catholic male religious order founded in Hungary in 1250 and now predominantly found in Poland
Society of Saint Paul, a Roman Catholic male religious congregation founded in 1914
Paulists, several Roman Catholic orders and congregations under the patronage of St Paul the Hermit and including the Order of Saint Paul the First Hermit and the Minims
Pauline Family, a Roman Catholic congregation of ten orders and lay institutes including the Society of St Paul
Minims (religious order), an order of friars founded by St Francis of Paola, known as the Paulines in German-speaking countries
Pupils of St Paul's School, London
Paulines (Thrace), town of ancient Thrace, now in Turkey

See also 	
Pauline (disambiguation)